Su (stylized as SU; born 20 November 1973, in Tsujidō, Fujisawa, Kanagawa) is an MC for the hip hop unit Rip Slyme.

Su is also a member of Funky Grammar Unit. His former wife is singer-songwriter Ai Otsuka. He has one daughter, born on March 24, 2011.

Discography

Internet songs

Guest appearances

Filmography

TV dramas

Entertainment shows

Films

Radio

References

External links
 

Japanese hip hop musicians
Musicians from Kanagawa Prefecture
1973 births
Living people
People from Fujisawa, Kanagawa